This is a list of settlements located on the coastlines of the two Prespa Lakes: Great Prespa Lake (also known simply as Prespa Lake) and Small Prespa Lake. The Prespa Lakes are both freshwater lakes, located between the countries of the Republic of Macedonia, Greece and Albania. Settlements are automatically listed for Great Prespa Lake from Šurlenci, Republic of Macedonia, clockwise. For Small Prespa Lake, settlements are listed from Plati, Greece, clockwise. The table can be reorganised based on country, municipality name, population, and the language(s) spoken in the settlement. Major settlements (population of 1000 or greater) are highlighted in bold.

Great Prespa Lake

References

Geography of Eastern Europe